Marion Mahony Griffin (February 14, 1871 – August 10, 1961) was an American architect and artist. She was one of the first licensed female architects in the world, and is considered an original member of the Prairie School. Her work in the United States developed and expanded the American Prairie School, and her work in India and Australia reflected Prairie School ideals of indigenous landscape and materials in the newly formed democracies. The scholar Deborah Wood stated that Griffin "did the drawings people think of when they think of Frank Lloyd Wright (one of her collaborating architects)."  

She produced some of the finest architectural drawing in America and Australia, and was instrumental in envisioning the design plans for the capital city of Australia, Canberra.

Early life and education
Mahony was born in 1871 in Chicago, Illinois, to Jeremiah Mahony, a journalist, poet, and teacher from Cork, Ireland, and Clara Hamilton, a schoolteacher. 

Her family moved to nearby Winnetka in 1880 after the Great Chicago Fire. In her memoir, Mahoney vividly describes her mother carrying her as an infant in a clothes basket, as they escape from the fire. Growing up in Winnetka, she became fascinated by the quickly disappearing landscape as suburban homes filled the area. She was influenced by her first cousin, architect Dwight Perkins, and decided to further her education. She graduated from the Massachusetts Institute of Technology (M.I.T.) in 1894. She was the second woman to do so, after Sophia Hayden, the designer of the Woman's building at the 1893 Chicago World's Columbian Exposition. Though highly talented, she sometimes struggled with her place in both society and the field. She was unsure of her ability to complete the thesis required for her bachelor's degree, but her professor, Constant-Désiré Despradelle, pushed her forward.

Architectural career

Work with Frank Lloyd Wright

After graduation, Mahony returned to Chicago, where she became the first woman to be licensed to practice architecture in Illinois. She worked in her cousin's architecture firm, which was located in Steinway Hall at 64 E. Van Buren in downtown Chicago. The space was shared with many other architects, including Robert C. Spencer, Myron Hunt, Webster Tomlinson, Irving Pond and Allen Bartlett Pond, Adamo Boari, Birch Long and Frank Lloyd Wright. In 1895, Mahony, the first employee hired by Frank Lloyd Wright, went to work designing buildings, furniture, stained glass windows, and decorative panels. Her beautiful watercolor renderings of buildings and landscapes became known as a staple of Wright's style, though she was never given credit by the famous architect. Over a century later she would be known as one of the greatest delineators of the architecture field, but during her life, her talent was seen as only an extension of the work done by male architects. She was associated with Wright's studio for almost fifteen years and was an important contributor to his reputation, particularly for the influential Wasmuth Portfolio, for which Mahony created more than half of the numerous renderings.  Architectural writer Reyner Banham called her the "greatest architectural delineator of her generation." Her rendering of the K. C. DeRhodes House in South Bend, Indiana, was praised by Wright upon its completion and by many critics.

Wright understated the contributions of others of the Prairie School, Mahony included. A clear understanding of Marion Mahony's contribution to the architecture of the Oak Park Studio comes from Wright's son, John Lloyd Wright, who says that William Drummond, Francis Barry Byrne, Walter Burley Griffin, Albert Chase McArthur, Marion Mahony, Isabel Roberts and George Willis were the draftsmen—the five men and two women who each made valuable contributions to Prairie-style architecture for which Wright became famous. During this time Mahony designed the Gerald Mahony Residence (1907) in Elkhart, Indiana for her brother and sister-in-law.

When Wright eloped to Europe with Mamah Borthwick Cheney in 1909, he offered the Studio's work to Mahony but she declined. After Wright had gone, Hermann V. von Holst, who had taken on Wright's commissions, hired Mahony with the stipulation that she would have control of the design. In this capacity, Mahony was the architect for a number of commissions Wright had abandoned. Two examples were the first (unbuilt) design for Henry Ford's Dearborn mansion, Fair Lane and the Amberg House in Grand Rapids, Michigan.

Work with Walter Burley Griffin

Mahony recommended Walter Burley Griffin to von Holst to develop landscaping for the area surrounding the three houses commissioned from Wright in Decatur, Illinois. Griffin was a fellow architect, a fellow ex-employee of Wright, and a leading member of the Prairie School of architecture. Mahony and Griffin worked on the Decatur project before their marriage; afterward, Mahony worked in Griffin's practice. A Walter Burley Griffin/Marion Mahony designed development that is home to an outstanding collection of Prairie School dwellings, Rock Crest – Rock Glen in Mason City, Iowa, is seen as their most dramatic American design development of the decade. It is the largest collection of Prairie Style homes surrounding a natural setting.

Mahony and Griffin married in 1911, a partnership that lasted 26 years. Mahony's watercolor perspectives of Griffins' design for Canberra, the new Australian capital, were instrumental in securing first prize in the international competition for the plan of the city. In 1914 the couple moved to Australia to oversee the building of Canberra. Mahony managed the Sydney office and was responsible for the design of their private commissions. In Australia, Mahony and Griffin was introduced to Anthroposophy and the ideas of Rudolf Steiner  which they embraced enthusiastically, and in Sydney they joined the Anthroposophy Society. In Australia, they pioneered the Knitlock construction method, inexactly emulated by Wright in his California textile block houses of the 1920s.

Walter was asked to create a design for a library for the University of Lucknow in India, and went to the college in September 1935, and soon gained several other commissions.  Marion arrived in April 1936, and soon took charge of the office, where she oversaw the design of many buildings.  Less than a year later, in Feb 1937. Walter died of peritonitis following a cholecystectomy. Mahony then wound up the office, leaving many projects unbuilt, and returned to Australia. Mahony and Griffin spread the Prairie Style to two continents, far from its origins. She credited Louis Sullivan as the impetus for the Prairie School philosophy. She thought Wright's habit of taking credit for the movement explained its early death in the United States.

Death and legacy
Marion Mahony Griffin did not stay long in Australia after Walter's death. By then in her late 60s, she returned to the United States and afterward was largely retired from her architectural career. "The one time she addressed the Illinois Society of Architects, she made no mention of her work, instead lectured the crowd on anthroposophy, a philosophy of spiritual knowledge developed by Rudolf Steiner."

She did however spend the next twenty years working on a massive volume of 1400 pages and 650 illustrations detailing her and Walter's working lives, which she titled "The Magic of America", which has yet to be formally published in book form. A manuscript deposited at the Art Institute of Chicago in c1949 was digitized, and since 2007 has been available online. In 2006 the National Library of Australia acquired a large collection of the Griffins' work including drawings, photographs, silk paintings and ephemera from the descendants of the Griffins’ Australian partner Eric Milton Nicholls.

Marion Mahony Griffin died in 1961 aged 90, and is buried in Graceland Cemetery.

In 2015, the beach at Jarvis Avenue in Rogers Park, Chicago was named in Mahony Griffin's honor.  When she returned to the United States in 1939, after her husband's death, she lived near the beach. The Australian Consul-General, Roger Price, attended the beach's dedication for the woman who was instrumental in the design the Australian capital.

Among the few  works attributed to Mahony that survive in the United States is a small mural in George B. Armstrong elementary school in Chicago attributed to Mahony, and several homes in Decatur.

The Australian Institute of Architects, NSW Chapter, honored her work with an annual award, the Marion Mahony Griffin Prize, for a distinctive body of work by a female architect for architectural education, journalism, research, theory, a professional practice or built architectural work.

Exhibitions 
1998–99: The Museum of Applied Arts & Sciences in Sydney held an exhibition entitled "Beyond Architecture: Marion Mahony and Walter Burley Griffin".

2013: An exhibition to celebrate the centenary of Canberra, held in the National Library of Australia and called "The Dream of a Century: the Griffins in Australia’s Capital", exhibited her drawings for the entire year.

2015: An exhibition of some of her work was held at the Block Museum of Northwestern University, Illinois, USA.

2016–17: An exhibition was held at the Elmhurst History Museum, Illinois, USA.

2020–2021: An exhibition at the Museum of Sydney entitled "Paradise on Earth".

2022: An exhibition at the National Archives of Australia in Canberra entitled "Marion: the other Griffin".

Architectural works
 All Souls Church (demolished), Evanston, Illinois – 1901
 The Gerald and Hattie Mahony Residence (demolished), Elkhart, Indiana – 1907
 David Amberg Residence, 505 College Avenue SE, Grand Rapids, Michigan – 1909
 Edward P. Irving Residence, 2 Millikin Place, Decatur, Illinois – 1909
 Robert Mueller Residence, 1 Millikin Place, Decatur, Illinois – 1909
 Adolph Mueller Residence, 4 Millikin Place, Decatur, Illinois – 1910
 Niles Club Company, Club House, Niles, Michigan – 1911
 Henry Ford Residence "FairLane" (unbuilt initial design; 1913)
 Koehne House (demolished 1974), Palm Beach, Florida – 1914
 Cooley Residence, Grand St. at Texas Avenue, Monroe, Louisiana
Fern Room, Cafe Australia, Melbourne, Australia – 1916
Pholiota, 23 Glenard Drive, Eaglemont, Victoria (the Griffins own house) – 1920
 Capitol Theatre, Swanston Street, Melbourne, Australia – 1921–1923
 "Stokesay", residence of Mr. and Mrs. Onians, 289 Nepean Highway, Seaford, Victoria, Australia – 1925
 Ellen Mower Residence, 12 The Rampart, Castlecrag, Sydney – 1926
 Creswick Residence, Castlecrag, Sydney, Australia – 1926
 S.R. Salter Residence (Knitlock construction), Toorak, Victoria, Australia – 1927
 Vaughan Griffin Residence, 52 Darebin St., Heidelberg, Victoria, Australia – 1927

References

Sources
 Birmingham, Elizabeth. "The Case of Marion Mahony Griffin and The Gendered Nature of Discourse in Architectural History." Women's Studies 35, no. 2 (March 2006): 87–123.
 Brooks, H. Allen, Frank Lloyd Wright and the Prairie School, Braziller (in association with the Cooper-Hewitt Museum), New York 1984; 
 Brooks, H. Allen, The Prairie School, W.W. Norton, New York 2006; 
 Brooks, H. Allen (editor), Prairie School Architecture: Studies from "The Western Architect", University of Toronto Press, Toronto & Buffalo 1975;  
 Brooks, H. Allen, The Prairie School: Frank Lloyd Wright and his Midwest Contemporaries, University of Toronto Press, Toronto 1972; 
 Hasbrouk, Wilbert R. 2012. "Influences on Frank Lloyd Wright, Blanche Ostertag and Marion Mahony." Journal of Illinois History 15, no. 2: 70–88. America: History & Life
 Korporaal, Glenda and Marion Mahony Griffin (2015) Making Magic: The Marion Mahony Griffin Story 
 Kruty, Paul, "Griffin, Marion Lucy Mahony", American National Biography Online, February 2000.
 Van Zanten, David (editor) Marion Mahony Reconsidered, University of Chicago Press, 2011; 
 Wood, Debora (editor), Marion Mahony Griffin: Drawing the Form of Nature, Mary and Leigh Block Museum of Art and Northwestern University Press, Evanston, Illinois 2005; 
Kruty, Paul., and Paul E. Sprague. Marion Mahony and Millikin Place: Creating a Prairie School Masterpiece With the Help of Frank Lloyd Wright, Herman Von Holst, and Walter Burley Griffin. St. Louis, Mo.: Walter Burley Griffin Society of America, 2007.

External links and additional readings
Pioneering Women of American Architecture, Marion Mahony Griffin
"Exhibit honors unsung architect Marion Mahony Griffin", Chicago Tribune, October 11, 2016
Marion Mahony Griffin, Digital Projects, New-York Historical Society
 Walter Burley Griffin and Marion Mahony Griffin architectural drawings, circa 1909–1937.Held by the Department of Drawings & Archives, Avery Architectural & Fine Arts Library, Columbia University.
Biographical notes at MIT
Marion Mahony Griffin: Drawing the Form of Nature an exhibition of Mahony Griffin's graphic art at the Block Museum, Northwestern University, United States of America
The Magic of America: Electronic Edition online version of Marion Mahony Griffin's unpublished manuscript, made available through the Art Institute of Chicago
"Rediscovering a Heroine of Chicago Architecture", New York Times, January 1, 2008
 [CC-By-SA] 
 
 National Archives of Australia
 Willoughby City Council Heritage 
 Places Journal, Marion Mahoney Griffin
 National Library of Australia: Griffin and Early Canberra Collection
https://www.griffinsociety.org/marion-mahony-griffin/.
Kruty, Paul., and Paul E. Sprague. Marion Mahony and Millikin Place: Creating a Prairie School Masterpiece With the Help of Frank Lloyd Wright, Herman Von Holst, and Walter Burley Griffin. St. Louis, Mo.: Walter Burley Griffin Society of America, 2007.

1871 births
1961 deaths
Artists from Chicago
American women architects
Australian women architects
American expatriates in India
Anthroposophists
Burials at Graceland Cemetery (Chicago)
Massachusetts Institute of Technology alumni
20th-century American architects
20th-century Australian architects
Victorian (Australia) architects
Walter Burley Griffin